The C&C 24 is a Canadian sailboat, that was designed by C&C Design and first built in 1975.

Production
The boat was built by C&C Yachts in Canada, but it is now out of production. The design was the smallest boat ever built by the company.

Design

The C&C 24 is a small recreational keelboat, built predominantly of fiberglass, with wood trim. It has a masthead sloop rig, a transom-hung rudder and a fixed fin keel. It displaces  and carries  of ballast.

The boat has a PHRF racing average handicap of 228 with a high of 238 and low of 223.

Operational history
In a review Michael McGoldrick wrote, "the C&C 24 is good looking boat with a fairly wide beam. More than with many other boats in this size category, you can "start" to get a big boat feel when standing on deck of the C&C 24. This boat has a nice wide open cabin down below, although it does not quite have full standing headroom. Some of these boats had a cabin layout where the head (toilet) located in the forward area under the v-berth (which could be made private from the rest of the cabin with a curtain). Most models had the head located under a folding contraption in the aft port corner of the main cabin."

In a 2010 review Steve Henkel wrote, "best features: Her beam helps ... lend her an extra bit of stability going to weather. Worst features: At least one owner mentioned that she tended to pound a little in choppy conditions. Two owners reported that the prop occasionally cavitated in waves. Still another owner observed that his fiancée did not like the head arrangement near the companionway in one of the early boats. The woman, complained that a mere canvas curtain did not afford enough privacy, and that caused the owner to buy a larger boat. (Engaged sailors beware!) Some say the settee berths are too narrow. Several owners mentioned difficulty in replacing foggy plastic windows, which were factory-glued to the fiberglass. In the end they perservered, using new acrylic and 3M-5200, plus throughbolts."

See also
List of sailing boat types

Similar sailboats
Achilles 24
Balboa 24
Atlantic City catboat
C&C SR 25
Challenger 24
Columbia 24
Islander 24
Islander 24 Bahama
J/24
MacGregor 24
Mirage 24
Nutmeg 24
San Juan 24
Seidelmann 245
Shark 24
Tonic 23

References

External links

Keelboats
1970s sailboat type designs
Sailing yachts
Sailboat type designs by C&C Design
Sailboat types built by C&C Yachts